Boris Pardo (born 22 March 1984) is an American soccer player who plays as a goalkeeper for the San Diego Sockers.

Career

Club career

Pardo started his career with Canadian side Toronto FC. Before the 2009 season, he signed for Sporting KC in the American top flight. On 30 June 2009, Pardo debuted for Sporting KC during a 3–3 draw with the Minnesota Thunder.

In 2010, he signed for American third tier club Kansas City Comets. In 2017, he signed for San Diego Sockers in the American top flight, helping them win the league.

International career

Pardo represented the United States at the 2017 WMF World Cup. He was eligible to represent Chile internationally through his parents.

References

External links
 Boris Pardo at SoccerStats.us

Association football goalkeepers
American expatriate sportspeople in Canada
American men's futsal players
American people of Chilean descent
Sportspeople of Chilean descent
American soccer players
Expatriate soccer players in Canada
FC Dallas players
Living people
Major Arena Soccer League players
Missouri Comets players
San Diego Sockers players
Sporting Kansas City players
Toronto FC players
1984 births